The Roman Catholic Diocese of Manga is a diocese located in the city of Manga in the Ecclesiastical province of Ouagadougou in Burkina Faso.

The current Bishop is Médard Léopold Ouédraogo.

History
 January 2, 1997: Established as Diocese of Manga from the Diocese of Koupéla and Metropolitan Archdiocese of Ouagadougou

Leadership
 Bishops of Manga (Roman rite)
 Bishop Wenceslas Compaoré (January 2, 1997  – December 28, 2010)
 Bishop Gabriel Sayaogo (December 28, 2010  – December 7, 2019), appointed Archbishop of Koupéla
 Bishop Médard Léopold Ouédraogo (June 16, 2022 - ...)

See also
Roman Catholicism in Burkina Faso

References

External links
 GCatholic.org

Manga
Christian organizations established in 1997
Roman Catholic dioceses and prelatures established in the 20th century
Manga, Roman Catholic Diocese of